Northern and Southern Courts period may refers to:

Northern and Southern dynasties (南北朝; pinyin: Nán-Běi Cháo), period in China, from 420 to 589
Northern and Southern States period (南北國時代, Nambukguksidae) in Korea, from 698 to 926
Nanboku-chō period (南北朝時代, Nanboku-chō jidai) in Japan, from 1336 to 1392.
Northern and Southern dynasties (Vietnam) (南北朝, Nam-Bắc triều), period in Vietnam from 1533 to 1592